The MV John F. Kennedy is the last remaining Kennedy-class ferry, formerly operated for the Staten Island Ferry carrying passengers between Whitehall Terminal in Manhattan and St. George Terminal in Staten Island. Built by the Levingston Shipbuilding Company between 1963 and 1965 for the Department of Marine and Aviation, the John F. Kennedy was delivered May 14, 1965.

History
John F. Kennedy was named for the 35th President of the United States. She entered service in 1965 alongside her two sister ships, the MV American Legion and the MV The Gov. Herbert H. Lehman.
While American Legion was retired in 2006 as the newer Molinari-class ferries entered service, and The Gov. Herbert H. Lehman was decommissioned the following year, John F. Kennedy remained in service as a favorite of both passengers and ferry operators, mainly running "as needed" on weekday schedules (when four of the six boats are needed for service). Captains considered her to be the most reliable vessel in the fleet, and riders preferred her abundant open-air deck space.

John F. Kennedy was retired from service in August 2021, to be replaced by the recently completed MV Michael H. Ollis, the lead ship of a new trio of ferries, collectively known as the Ollis-class. The design of this new class is heavily influenced by John F. Kennedy, featuring her distinctive outdoor promenades and extended foredecks.

Following her retirement, Kennedy was moored at St. George Terminal to await her fate. By January 16, 2022, New York City was attempting to sell the vessel at auction for $125,000, after an earlier attempt to sell the vessel at $250,000 garnered no bids. The auction concluded on January 19, 2022, with the ferry sold "as is" and "where is" to Paul Italia, Ron Castellano and Staten Island natives Colin Jost and Pete Davidson for a final selling price of $280,100. The new owners planned on converting the ferry into an entertainment venue at the cost of several million dollars. In April 2022, Kennedy was towed to a shipyard in New Brighton, Staten Island, since her final location remained undecided.

See also
 List of memorials to John F. Kennedy

References

1965 ships
Staten Island Ferry vessels
Ships built in Orange, Texas